Hugo Dionisio Chila Ayoví (born 22 July 1987 in Santo Domingo de Los Tsáchilas) is an Ecuadorian long jumper and triple jumper.

Career
He set a personal best and Ecuadorian record of 16.70 m in the triple jump at the 2009 World Championships in Athletics. He bettered this at the 2009 Bolivarian Games, jumping 17.03 m for the gold and a Games record. He also set a national record in the long jump competition at the 2009 Games, but his mark of 8.16 m was only enough for silver as Víctor Castillo produced a Championship record for the gold.

Personal bests
100 m: 10.37 s A (wind: +1.1 m/s) –  Cuenca, 10 March 2007
Long jump: 8.16 m A (wind: +0.0 m/s) –  Sucre, 23 November 2009
Triple jump: 17.03 m A (wind: +0.3 m/s) –  Sucre, 25 November 2009

Achievements

References

External links

1987 births
Living people
Ecuadorian male long jumpers
Ecuadorian male triple jumpers
Athletes (track and field) at the 2007 Pan American Games
Athletes (track and field) at the 2008 Summer Olympics
Athletes (track and field) at the 2011 Pan American Games
Olympic athletes of Ecuador
Pan American Games competitors for Ecuador
World Athletics Championships athletes for Ecuador
South American Games gold medalists for Ecuador
South American Games bronze medalists for Ecuador
South American Games medalists in athletics
Competitors at the 2006 South American Games